Leith Shankland (born 30 June 1991, Springs) is a South African swimmer.

He competed in the 4 × 100 metre medley relay event at the 2012 Summer Olympics. He is 6'5" and 200 lbs.

He also competed at the Glasgow 2014 Commonwealth Games. He won a bronze medal in the 4 x 100 metre medley relay and a silver in the 4 x 100m freestyle relay. He also qualified for the 100m freestyle final.   At the 2014 Commonwealth Games, he was part of the South African teams that won silver in the men's 4 x 100 m freestyle relay and bronze in the men's 4 x 100 m medley relay.<ref> 

He is part of the South African freestyle relay team who won the bronze medal in the 4 x 200m freestyle relay in 2014. <ref> 

Since the start 2022, he has started jujitsu at a club based in Wandsworth, London, Guild Fighters and has recently been awarded a blue belt in December 2022. <ref>

References

South African male swimmers
1991 births
Olympic swimmers of South Africa
Swimmers at the 2012 Summer Olympics
Commonwealth Games medallists in swimming
Living people
Commonwealth Games silver medallists for South Africa
Commonwealth Games bronze medallists for South Africa
African Games gold medalists for South Africa
African Games medalists in swimming
Swimmers at the 2014 Commonwealth Games
Competitors at the 2011 All-Africa Games
People from Springs, Gauteng
Medallists at the 2014 Commonwealth Games